Jory is a surname.

Arturo Zúñiga Jory (born 1982), Chilean politician
Herbert Jory (1888–1966), South Australian architect
Jon Jory, American theatrical director
Percy Jory (1888–?), Australian rules footballer and umpire
Rex Jory, Australian journalist
Rodney Jory (born 1938), Australian physicist
Sarah Jory (born 1969),  English musician and vocalist
Victor Jory (1902–1982), Canadian-born American actor